Good Bones and Simple Murders is a book by Canadian author Margaret Atwood, originally published in 1994. Although classified with Atwood's short fiction, it is an eclectic collection, featuring parables, monologues, prose poems, condensed science fiction, reconfigured fairy tales, as well as Atwood's own illustrations. Much of the book is a reprint of two earlier Atwood works, Good Bones and Murder in the Dark.

The story Gertrude Talks Back sees Gertrude, mother of Hamlet setting her son straight about Old Hamlet's murder: "It wasn't Claudius, darling, it was me!"

References 

 Pratt, Laura. "Heather Reisman's little list of literary party favours." National Post Dec. 1, 2001. pg. PD. 5.

1994 short story collections
Short story collections by Margaret Atwood
Doubleday (publisher) books
New Canadian Library